Herálec is a municipality and village in Havlíčkův Brod District in the Vysočina Region of the Czech Republic. It has about 1,100 inhabitants.

Administrative parts
Villages of Dubí, Kamenice, Koječín, Mikulášov, Pavlov u Herálce and Zdislavice are administrative parts of Vilémov.

Notable people
Adolf Kosárek (1830–1859), landscape painter
Jan Zábrana (1931–1984), writer and translator

References

Villages in Havlíčkův Brod District